Hidalgo Place is a 24-storey residential building in Rockwell Center, in Makati. The building was completed in 1999.

See also 
 List of tallest buildings in the Philippines

References 

Buildings and structures in Makati
Skidmore, Owings & Merrill buildings
Residential buildings completed in 1999
Residential condominiums in Metro Manila
1999 establishments in the Philippines